Joanne van Os (born 1955) is an Australian author of memoir, children's and adult fiction.

Personal life 
Van Os, born in 1955, grew up in Melbourne and moved to Darwin at age 20. At age 22, she met her future husband Rod Ansell, widely regarded as the inspiration for the character Crocodile Dundee, with whom she had two sons and subsequently divorced. Van Os later remarried and had a daughter. She is currently based in Darwin.

Her daughter died in a boating accident in 2009 aged 16, and her parents decided to donate her organs. After this, van Os became an advocate for organ donation and increasing the amount of accessible information available to families regarding the donation process.

Through her sister Leonie, van Os is aunt to actors Luke, Chris and Liam Hemsworth.

Career 
Van Os worked as a lab researcher, a radio operator, a teacher and an electorate officer.

In 2005 she published a memoir about her time with Ansell titled Outback Heart. She has subsequently published three novels for children and a historical fiction novel for adults.

Bibliography

Memoir 
Outback Heart (2005, Bantam Books)

Children’s books 
Brumby Plains (2006, Penguin Random House)
Castaway (2007, Penguin Random House)
The Secret of the Lonely Isles (2011, Penguin Random House)

Fiction 
Ronan’s Echo (2014, Pan Macmillan)

References

External links 

Living people
Australian children's writers
Australian memoirists
Australian people of Dutch descent
Australian people of Irish descent
Australian women memoirists
Australian women children's writers
Australian women novelists
21st-century Australian novelists
21st-century Australian women writers
21st-century memoirists
1955 births